"Wild in the Country" is a song first recorded by Elvis Presley as part of the soundtrack for his 1961 motion picture Wild in the Country.

Background
It was written by Hugo Peretti, Luigi Creatore, and George Weiss, who also wrote "Can't Help Falling in Love".

In 1961 the song was released on a single with "I Feel So Bad" on the opposite side. In the United States "Wild in the Country" peaked at number 26 on the Billboard Hot 100, while "I Feel So Bad" peaked at number 5. Also, "Wild in the Country" entered the top 10 in Flamish Belgium (Flanders) and Hong Kong.

Reception 
As of August 2017, the single "Wild in the Country" / "I Feel So Bad" is Presley's 38th most selling single in the UK.

Charts

References

External links 
 Elvis Presley – I Feel So Bad / Wild In The Country at Discogs

1961 songs
1961 singles
Elvis Presley songs
RCA Records singles
Songs written by Hugo Peretti
Songs written by Luigi Creatore
Songs written by George David Weiss
Songs written for films